Rhamu Airport  is an airport in Kenya.

Location
The coordinates of Rhamu Airport are:3°55'33.0"N, 41°13'28.0"E (Latitude:3.925829; Longitude:41.224440).

Overview
This is a civilian airport. The runway measures .

See also
 Rhamu
 Kenya Civil Aviation Authority
 List of airports in Kenya

References

External links
 Kenya Civil Aviation Authority Homepage

Airports in Kenya
Mandera County